Methylstenbolone, known by the nicknames M-Sten, Methyl-Sten, and Ultradrol, is a synthetic and orally active anabolic–androgenic steroid (AAS) and a 17α-methylated derivative of dihydrotestosterone (DHT) which was never introduced for medical use. It is a designer steroid and has been sold via the internet marketed as a dietary/nutritional supplement.

Side effects

Chemistry

Methylstenbolone, also known as 2,17α-dimethyl-δ1-4,5α-dihydrotestosterone (2,17α-dimethyl-δ1-DHT) or as 2,17α-dimethyl-5α-androst-1-en-17β-ol-3-one, is a synthetic androstane steroid and a 17α-alkylated derivative of DHT. It is the 17α-methylated derivative of stenbolone, as well as the δ1-isomer of methasterone (2α,17α-dimethyl-DHT). Related AAS include mestanolone and methyl-1-testosterone.

References

Tertiary alcohols
Androgens and anabolic steroids
Androstanes
Designer drugs
Hepatotoxins
Enones